Demidovskaya is a rural locality (a village) in Dvinitskoye Rural Settlement, Syamzhensky District, Vologda Oblast, Russia. The population was 31 as of 2002.

Geography 
Demidovskaya is located 55 km northeast of Syamzha (the district's administrative centre) by road. Kononovskaya is the nearest rural locality.

References 

Rural localities in Syamzhensky District